Parasimulium is a genus of black flies containing two subgenera and four species. They are found in western North America. Most species are rare, and some Canadian species are cave dwellers.

Species
 Subgenus Astoneomyia Peterson, 1977
 P. melanderi Stone, 1963
 Subgenus Parasimulium Malloch, 1914
 P. crosskeyi Peterson, 1977
 P. furcatum Malloch, 1914
 P. stonei Peterson, 1977

Literature cited

Simuliidae
Chironomoidea genera
Taxa named by John Russell Malloch